Andreas Ulland Andersen (born 6 May 1989) is a Norwegian footballer who plays as a midfielder for Vard Haugesund.

Club career
He joined Viking in autumn 2006, after playing for the Norwegian team Vard Haugesund.

In the latter half of 2010 he joined Sandnes Ulf on loan. During the 2011 season, Andersen was on another loan, this time to Randaberg.

Andersen signed a one-year contract with Sandnes Ulf after being released by Viking ahead of the 2012-season. Ahead of the 2013 season he joined Bryne FK.

He is the older brother of the footballer Eirik Ulland Andersen.

Career statistics

References

1989 births
Living people
People from Haugesund
Norwegian footballers
SK Vard Haugesund players
Viking FK players
Sandnes Ulf players
Randaberg IL players
Bryne FK players
Eliteserien players
Norwegian First Division players
Norwegian Second Division players
Association football midfielders
Sportspeople from Rogaland